Philip Toone (born 1965) is a Canadian politician, who was elected to the House of Commons of Canada in the 2011 election.

Early life
Philip Toone was born in Ottawa in 1965. He currently resides in Maria, Quebec, with his partner of 13 years. His former occupation was that of a teacher and notary.

Political career

Toone ran for a seat to the Canadian House of Commons in the 2004 Canadian federal election. He was defeated finishing in fifth place losing to incumbent Raynald Blais in the electoral district of Gaspésie—Îles-de-la-Madeleine. He ran for a second time in the 2011 Canadian federal election and won.

He was one of five openly gay candidates elected to Parliament in the 2011 election.

He was defeated in the 2015 election by Diane Lebouthillier of the Liberal Party.

Election results

References

External links

1965 births
Living people
New Democratic Party MPs
Members of the House of Commons of Canada from Quebec
Canadian LGBT Members of Parliament
Gay politicians
People from Maria, Quebec
21st-century Canadian politicians
21st-century Canadian LGBT people
Canadian gay men